At least seven monkey species are native to Central America.  An eighth species, the Coiba Island howler (Alouatta coibensis) is often recognized, but some authorities treat it as a subspecies of the mantled howler, (A. palliata).   A ninth species, the black-headed spider monkey (Ateles fusciceps)is also often recognized, but some authorities regard it as a subspecies of Geoffroy's spider monkey (A. geoffroyi).  In addition, two species of white-faced capuchin monkey have been generally recognized since the 2010s although some primatologists consider these to be a single species.  Taxonomically, all Central American monkey species are classified as New World monkeys, and they belong to four families.  Five species belong to the family Atelidae, which includes the howler monkeys, spider monkeys, woolly monkeys and muriquis.  Three species belong to the family Cebidae, the family that includes the capuchin monkeys and squirrel monkeys.   One species each belongs to the night monkey family, Aotidae, and the tamarin and marmoset family, Callitrichidae.

Geoffroy's spider monkey is the only monkey found in all seven Central American countries, and it is also found in Colombia, Ecuador and Mexico.  Other species that have a widespread distribution throughout Central America are the mantled howler, which is found in five Central American countries, and the Panamanian white-faced capuchin (Cebus imitator), which is found in four Central American countries.  The Coiba Island howler, the black-headed spider monkey, the Panamanian night monkey (Aotus zonalis), the Colombian white-faced capuchin (Cebus capucinus) and Geoffroy's tamarin (Saguinus geoffroyi) are each found in only one Central American country, Panama.  The Central American squirrel monkey (Saimiri oerstedii) also has a restricted distribution, living only on part of the Pacific coast of Costa Rica and a small portion of Panama.  El Salvador is the Central American country with the fewest monkey species, as only Geoffroy's spider monkey lives there.  Panama has the most species, nine, as the only Central American monkey species that does not include Panama within its range is the Yucatán black howler (Alouatta pigra).

One Central American monkey, the black-headed spider monkey, is considered to be Critically Endangered by the International Union for Conservation of Nature (IUCN).  Geoffroy's spider monkey and the Yucatán black howler are both considered to be Endangered.  The Central American squirrel monkey had been considered endangered, but its conservation status was upgraded to Vulnerable in 2008.  The Coiba Island howler is also considered to be vulnerable.  The white-faced capuchins, the mantled howler and Geoffroy's tamarin are all considered to be of Least Concern from a conservation standpoint.

Monkey watching is a popular tourist activity in parts of Central America.  In Costa Rica, popular areas to view monkeys include Corcovado National Park, Manuel Antonio National Park, Santa Rosa National Park Guanacaste National Park and Lomas de Barbudal Biological Reserve.  Corcovado National Park is the only park in Costa Rica in which all the country's four monkey species can be seen.  The more accessible Manuel Antonio National Park is the only other park in Costa Rica in which the Central American squirrel monkey is found, and the Panamanian white-faced capuchin and mantled howler are also commonly seen there.  Within Panama, areas to view monkeys include Darién National Park, Soberanía National Park and a number of islands on Gatun Lake including Barro Colorado Island.  In addition, Geoffroy's tamarin can be seen in Metropolitan Natural Park within Panama City.  In Belize, the easily explored Community Baboon Sanctuary was established specifically for the preservation of the Yucatán black howler and now contains more than 1000 monkeys.

Key

Central American monkey species

Footnotes
Some authorities regard Alouatta coibensis as a subspecies of Alouatta palliata.  Sizes given are for Alouatta palliata.
Some authorities regard Aotus zonalis as a subspecies of Aotus lemurinus, in which case its trinomial name is Aotus lemurinus zonalis.
Some authorities regard Ateles fusciceps as a subspecies of Ateles geoffroyi.
Formerly regarded to be conspecific with Cebus imitator.  Sizes given are for Cebus imitator.

See also
Lists of mammals by region

References

'
Central American monkey species
'